Coslett Herbert Waddell (Rev.) (March 6, 1858 at Drumcro, County Antrim – June 8, 1919) was an Irish priest, (Church of Ireland), and botanist.

He was related, via his mother Maria Langtry, to Lillie Langtry, the "Jersey Lily". He went to Lurgan and Trinity College, Dublin, where he eventually graduated as well: he got his B.A. in 1880 and his M.A. in 1888.

He followed his religious calling and was ordained as a deacon in 1881 and priest in 1882. He became vicar in Saintfield in 1890 and rector of Greyabbey in 1912. While being a priest in several consecutive parishes, he continued his studies and became Bachelor of Divinity in 1892.

He showed an early interest in botany, in which he was aided by S.A. Stewart. From 1893 onwards he was a contributor to the Journal of Botany and a frequent contributor to the Irish Naturalist.

He was the author of many botanical papers. He is known for work on difficult genera of flowering plants, such as brambles, roses, hawkweeds and knotweeds where asexual reproduction dominates leading to many microspecies. He was the first to record the rare Seaside Centaury (Centaurium littorale) in Ireland in 1913. 

He was especially interested and specialised in bryophytes, especially liverworts and proposed the establishment of the Moss Exchange Club in 1896. This members club for exchange of specimens and information later developed into the British Bryological Society.

A large collection of his specimens is in the Ulster Museum Herbarium in Belfast, having been donated in 1919 to the Queen's University of Belfast after his death by his widow. He took a warm interest in the Belfast Naturalists' Field Club and served on the Committee.

He died at Greyabbey, where he was incumbent, and was buried at Maralin.

Publications

 Waddell, C.H. 1905. Glyceria festucaeformis at Portaferry. Irish Naturalists 14: 19.
 Waddell, C.H. 1912. Some County Down plants. Irish Naturalists 21: 133-134.
 Waddell, C.H. 1917. Rare plants of the Co. Down coast. Irish Naturalists 26: 12-13.

References

 Praeger, R. Lloyd. 1919. Obituary. Rev. Coslett Herbert Waddell, B.D. The Irish Naturalist Journal 28: 108.
 Praeger, R. Lloyd. 1949. Some Irish Naturalists. A biographical note-book. Dundalk.
 The Herbarium of the National Museum and Galleries of Northern Ireland. The Ulster Museum (.pdf file on line)

People from County Antrim
1858 births
1919 deaths
19th-century Irish botanists
19th-century Irish Anglican priests
20th-century Irish Anglican priests
Alumni of Trinity College Dublin
20th-century Irish botanists